Dioprosopa is a genus of drone flies in the family Syrphidae. There are at least two described species in the genus Dioprosopa, both found in the New World.

Dioprosopa was formerly considered a subgenus of Pseudodoros, but was promoted to genus rank as a result of phylogenetic studies in 2018.

Species
The following two species are recognised in the genus Dioprosopa:
 Dioprosopa clavata (Fabricius 1794)
 Dioprosopa vockerothi Kassebeer, 2000

Gallery

References

Further reading

External links

 

Syrphini